Amorphospermum is a genus of plants in the family Sapotaceae described as a genus in 1870.

There is only one accepted species, Amorphospermum antilogum, native to Queensland, New South Wales, and Papua New Guinea.

formerly included
now in other genera: Elaeoluma Englerophytum Niemeyera Pycnandra Synsepalum

References

Chrysophylloideae
Monotypic Ericales genera
Flora of Australia
Flora of New Guinea
Sapotaceae genera
Taxa named by Ferdinand von Mueller